Eloy is the debut album from German rock band Eloy. It was released in 1971.

Track listing
Side one
 "Today" (Bornemann, Schriever, Wieczorke) – 5:56
 "Something Yellow" (Schriever, Wieczorke) – 8:15
 "Eloy" (Bornemann, Draht, Schriever, Wieczorke) – 6:15

Side two
"Song of a Paranoid Soldier" (Schriever, Wieczorke) – 4:50
 "Voice of Revolution" (Schriever, Wieczorke) – 3:07
 "Isle of Sun" (Schriever) – 6:03
 "Dillus Roady" (Bornemann, Schriever, Wieczorke) – 6:32

1997 2 CD Edition (Second Battle) Bonus Disc
"Walk alone" (Schriever, Wieczorke) – 2:47
 "Daybreak" (Bornemann, Schriever) – 2:45
 "Interview with Manfred Wieczorke (12.8.1997)" – 23:09

2008 Remastered Edition bonus tracks
"Walk alone" (Schriever, Wieczorke) – 2:47
 "Daybreak" (Bornemann, Schriever) – 2:45
 "Vibrations of My Mind" (Bornemann, Draht, Schriever, Wieczorke, Stocker) – 3:35

Personnel

Eloy
Erich Schriever – lead vocals, keyboards
Frank Bornemann – guitar, harmonica, percussion
Manfred Wieczorke – guitar, backing vocals, bass
Wolfgang Stocker – bass
Helmuth Draht – drums

Additional personnel
Produced by Peter M. Freiherr Von Lepel
Engineered by Conny Plank

References

External links

1971 debut albums
Eloy (band) albums
Philips Records albums